The Women's Enfranchisement Act, 1930, was an act of the Parliament of South Africa which granted white women aged 21 and older the right to vote and to run for office. It also had the effect of diluting the limited voting power of non-white people (in the Cape Province) by effectively doubling the number of white voters. It was enacted by the National Party government of Prime Minister J. B. M. Hertzog.

The first general election at which women could vote was the election of 17 May 1933. At that election Leila Reitz (wife of Deneys Reitz) was elected as the first female MP, representing Parktown for the South African Party.

The act enfranchised all white women, while certain property qualifications still applied to men. In June 1931 the Franchise Laws Amendment Act, 1931 enfranchised all white men while retaining the property qualifications for non-white voters, thus further diluting the non-white vote. The delimitation of electoral divisions was still based on the white male population until April 1937, when the Electoral Quota Act, 1937 altered it to be based on the whole white population.

The Women's Enfranchisement Act was repealed in 1946 when the franchise laws were consolidated into the Electoral Consolidation Act, 1946.

See also
 Feminism in South Africa
 Women's Enfranchisement Association of the Union

References
 
 

Repealed South African legislation
Women's suffrage in South Africa
Women's rights legislation
Women's rights in South Africa
1930 in South African law
1930 in women's history
Election law in South Africa